"Pinch Me" is a song by Canadian rock band Barenaked Ladies. It was released as the first single from their 2000 album, Maroon, on August 7, 2000. The song became the band's final top-forty hit in the United States, peaking at number 15 on the Billboard Hot 100 on November 14, 2000. It also peaked at number two on Billboards Adult Alternative Songs and Adult Top 40 charts. In Canada, the single reached number four on the RPM Top Singles chart, becoming the band's most recent top-ten hit in their native country.

Background
The song was co-written by frontmen Steven Page and Ed Robertson, but the concept and base for the song came from Robertson. He wrote the song following the "roller-coaster" success of Stunt, and returning to Canada to find people less interested or aware of the success. "I was trying to get to the root of what I was feeling... 'this is all great, but not right here it's not – not where I live, and not in my heart'... It's this notion that you know things are good – they're just not quite good for you."

The fundamental guitar riff of the song (through the verses) was based on the song "Leaving Las Vegas" by Sheryl Crow. The recording (and most live performances) is based on a drum loop (along with which drummer Tyler Stewart plays). The loop was created by taking the best two bars of Stewart himself playing drums, and then looping them. The song was originally written with the chorus rap as the less prominent "underpinning" half of the vocal, with the melody being more prominent, but as the writing process went along, the rap became the foreground. Noting that the melody line was now the background, they took the lyric and also used it for the bridge of the song.

According to Ed Robertson, during the Austin, TX concert on July 21, 2012, "Pinch Me" has one of his favorite "fake lyrics".  He explained, "Often when we're writing a song, we just put in fake lyrics for a while, just to fill the space, 'cause we know what we want the melody to be, but we haven't finished the lyrics."  The original chorus of the song was this:  "Doesn't anyone, make a Chelsea bun, like they used to back, in the day?  Sticky-sweet, it's a special treat.  If Chelsea Buns were men, I'd be gay."

Critical reception
Chuck Taylor, of Billboard magazine, reviewed the song favorably, saying that "the production is tight, and the melody alternates between minimalist verses and Ed Robertson's trademark hyperkinetic delivery." He goes on to say that the "quirky lyric doesn't go for the wit as past hits have, but it still captures the band's friendly side, which had earned it a strong cult following long before it tore up the charts."

Track listings

US CD single
 "Pinch Me" (radio edit)
 "Powder Blue"

US 7-inch single
 "Pinch Me" (radio edit) – 3:48
 "Falling for the First Time" (album version) – 3:40

European and Australian CD single
 "Pinch Me"
 "Pinch Me" (radio edit)
 "Inline Bowline"
 "Born Human"

Personnel
 Ed Robertson – lead vocals, acoustic and electric guitars
 Jim Creeggan – electric bass, viola, violin, backing vocals 
 Kevin Hearn – electric piano, organ, backing vocals 
 Tyler Stewart – drums, backing vocals 
 Steven Page – acoustic and electric guitars, backing vocals
 Rob Menegoni – shaker

Charts

Weekly charts

Year-end charts

Release history

References

2000 singles
2000 songs
Barenaked Ladies songs
Music videos directed by Phil Harder
Patter songs
Reprise Records singles
Song recordings produced by Don Was
Songs written by Ed Robertson
Songs written by Steven Page